Isabella "Isa" Echeverri Restrepo (born 16 June 1994) is a Colombian former professional footballer who last played as a centre back for Liga MX Femenil club CF Monterrey and the Colombia women's national team.

References

External links 
 

1994 births
Living people
Sportspeople from Medellín
Colombian women's footballers
Women's association football central defenders
Women's association football midfielders
Toledo Rockets women's soccer players
Elpides Karditsas players
Sevilla FC (women) players
C.F. Monterrey (women) players
Primera División (women) players
Colombia women's international footballers
2015 FIFA Women's World Cup players
Olympic footballers of Colombia
Footballers at the 2016 Summer Olympics
Footballers at the 2015 Pan American Games
Medalists at the 2015 Pan American Games
Pan American Games medalists in football
Footballers at the 2019 Pan American Games
Medalists at the 2019 Pan American Games
Pan American Games gold medalists for Colombia
Colombian expatriate women's footballers
Colombian expatriate sportspeople in the United States
Expatriate women's soccer players in the United States
Colombian expatriate sportspeople in Greece
Expatriate women's footballers in Greece
Colombian expatriate sportspeople in Spain
Expatriate women's footballers in Spain
Colombian expatriate sportspeople in Mexico
Expatriate women's footballers in Mexico
Colombian people of Basque descent